William "Budgie" McGhie (born 13 November 1961) is a Scottish former footballer who played as a defender for three clubs in the Scottish Football League. He is currently the assistant manager of Pollok.

Career
McGhie joined Clydebank (the 1965 version) from Clydebank Boys Club in 1981 and went on to make 177 league appearances for the club in the Scottish Football League. He moved to Partick Thistle in 1987 before joining Queen of the South where he made a further 164 league appearances.

McGhie stepped down to Junior level in 1994, playing for Arthurlie, Shettleston and Petershill. He returned to Shettleston as a coach until the end of 2002–03 season.

Managerial career
McGhie was appointed manager of the reformed Clydebank when the club entered the Junior grade in July 2003. He resigned after a mainly successful 13 and a half years in December 2016, having lifted four trophies as well as achieving four leaguerunners up spots In season 2008–09 he guided The Bankies to the Scottish Junior Cup Final where they narrowly lost out by the odd goal in three to Auchinleck Talbot at Rugby Park, Kilmarnock.

In May 2017, McGhie was appointed Kilbirnie Ladeside manager. In October 2018, he left Kilbirnie and shortly afterwards was confirmed as assistant manager of Pollok.

Television work
He has also worked as a television pundit for BBC Alba's Junior football coverage.

References

External links

Living people
1961 births
Scottish footballers
Clydebank F.C. (1965) players
Partick Thistle F.C. players
Queen of the South F.C. players
Association football defenders
Scottish Football League players
Scottish Junior Football Association players
Scottish football managers
Arthurlie F.C. players
Glasgow United F.C. players
Petershill F.C. players
Scottish Junior Football Association managers
Kilbirnie Ladeside F.C. managers
Clydebank F.C. players
Clydebank F.C. managers